Beijing Institute of Genomics (BIG) is a genomics research center of Chinese Academy of Sciences (CAS).

History
BIG was officially founded by Yang Huanming, Wang Jian, Yu Jun and others scientists on November 28, 2003, when BGI (formerly the Beijing Genomics Institute, founded in 1999 to participate in the International Human Genome Project on behalf of China) became part of China Academy of Sciences. In 2006 BGI and BIG split, with Yang Huanming and Wang Jian moving BGI out of the CAS system and taking it to Shenzhen, and Yu Jun maintaining BIG in CAS. Yu Jun formalising this split by selling his stake in BGI for a minor sum.

Its predecessor was Human Genome Research Center of Institute of Genetics and Developmental Biology (CAS) which was founded in August 1998.

Besides coming out of the International Human Genome Project, other achievements of BIG included the participation of the International HapMap Project; the completion of the Chinese Superhybrid Rice (Oryza sativa L. ssp. indica) Genome Project; the collaborations of the Silkworm Genome Project and the Chicken Genome Diversity Project.

In 2003, SARS virus became epidemic in China and BIG was the first to sequence SARS virus whole genome in China.

In 2007, BIG moved to ChaoYang District, Beijing.

In 2019 it was announced Yu Jun was involved in the informed consent meeting for He Jiankui's embryo-editing trial.

Current
At present, BIG has a number of nearly two hundred faculty and staff members, including one Academia Sinica academician and one CAS academician and the number of graduated students is about two hundred.

Research Divisions 

 CAS Key Laboratory of Genome Sciences & Information (He Lin)
 CAS Key Laboratory of Genomic and Precision Medicine (Zeng Changqing)
 BIG Data Center (National Genomics Data Center)
 Core Genomic Facility (Wu Jiayan)

Research Program
 International Rice Genome Sequencing Project
 International Chicken Genome Sequencing Project
 HapMap Project
 The Saudi-Sino Date Palm Genome Project
 Genome polymorphism of several populations in China
 The Cancer Genome Project
 The Stem Cell Genome Project

Lists of Directors
 Yang Huanming
 Wu Chung-I

References

External links 
 Official website of Beijing Institute of Genomics
 Computational Biology and Bioinformatics in Beijing Institute of Genomics

Genetics or genomics research institutions
Research institutes of the Chinese Academy of Sciences